Mionów  (German Polnisch Müllmen, 1939-45: Niederrode in Oberschlesien) is a village in the administrative district of Gmina Głogówek (Oberglogau), within Prudnik County, Opole Voivodeship, in south-western Poland, close to the Czech border.

Since 2009 the village, like much of the surrounding area, has been officially bilingual in German and Polish.

References

Villages in Prudnik County